PRNG may refer to:

 Pseudorandom number generator
 Puerto Rico National Guard